KCLH (94.7 FM) is a radio station  broadcasting a classic hits format. Licensed to Caledonia, Minnesota, United States, the station serves the La Crosse area. The station is currently owned by Mid-West Family Broadcasting The station no longer broadcast in HD radio.

History
The station went on the air as KSOF on August 31, 1994. The station changed its call sign to KHTW on April 11, 1997; to KSFF on October 26, 1998; and to the current KCLH on October 10, 2001.

References

External links

Radio stations in Minnesota
Classic hits radio stations in the United States
Radio stations established in 1994
1994 establishments in Minnesota